Héctor Adolfo de Bourgoing (23 July 1934 – 24 January 1993) was a footballer who operated as a right winger. He played international football for Argentina and France.

Club career

De Bourgoing started his career at Club Atlético Tigre in the Argentine 1st division in 1953. In 1957 he was transferred to Argentine giants River Plate where he won his first and only major title in his first season with the club.

During 1959 he was enticed into a move to France to play for Nice, he played for them for four years before moving to Bordeaux in 1963 and finally retiring from football in 1970 at Racing Paris.

Honours

River Plate

 Argentine Primera División: 1957

International career
De Bourgoing was born in Argentina and was of French descent. He was selected to play for Argentina on five occasions before moving to Europe, where under the rules of the day he could change international allegiance to play for France. He represented the French national team in the 1966 FIFA World Cup, scoring a goal in a 2–1 defeat by Argentina's rivals Uruguay.

International goals

|- bgcolor=#DFE7F
| 1 || 11 April 1962 || Parc des Princes, Paris ||  || 1–3 || Lost || Friendly
|-
|- bgcolor=#DFE7F
| 2 || 15 July 1966 || White City Stadium, London ||  || 1–2 || Lost || 1966 World Cup
|}

References

External links
 

1934 births
1993 deaths
People from Posadas, Misiones
Argentine footballers
Argentina international footballers
Dual internationalists (football)
French footballers
France international footballers
Argentine people of French descent
Association football defenders
Ligue 1 players
Argentine Primera División players
Club Atlético Tigre footballers
Club Atlético River Plate footballers
OGC Nice players
FC Girondins de Bordeaux players
Racing Club de France Football players
1966 FIFA World Cup players
Argentine emigrants to France
Sportspeople from Misiones Province